The white-rumped hawk (Parabuteo leucorrhous) is a species of bird of prey in subfamily Accipitrinae, the "true" hawks, of family Accipitridae. It is found in Argentina, Bolivia, Brazil, Colombia, Ecuador, Paraguay, Peru, and Venezuela.

Taxonomy and systematics

The white-rumped hawk was previously placed in the large genus Buteo but a 2009 paper provided the evidence to move it to genus Parabuteo, joining Harris's hawk (P. unicinctus) there. An earlier proposal to place it in the resurrected genus Percnohierax was not accepted. The white-rumped hawk is monotypic.

Description

Males and females have the same plumage. Adults are almost entirely black but with the namesake white rump and undertail coverts. Their tail has a narrow grayish-brown band at its midpoint and their thighs are feathered rufous. Their eye, cere, legs, and feet are yellow. Immatures have brown upperparts with rufous mottling and heavily mottled rufous underparts.

Distribution and habitat

The white-rumped hawk has two separate ranges. One is from the Andes and other mountains of Venezuela and Colombia south in the Andes through Ecuador into Peru, Boliva, and northwestern Argentina. The other range is from southern Brazil through Paraguay into northeastern Argentina. The species inhabits the interior and edges of dense subtropical and tropical forest and also the Chaco in the east. It occurs at lower elevations in its eastern range.

Behavior

Movement

The white-rumped hawk is generally sedentary but there is evidence that it is somewhat nomadic.

Feeding

The white-rumped hawk's hunting methods and diet are mostly unknown. It has been documented feeding on reptiles, frogs, insects, and rats.

Breeding

The white-rumped hawk's breeding season appears to vary geographically, spanning at least February and March in Colombia and possibly June to January in Ecuador, and including October in Brazil. It contained two eggs.

Vocalization

The white-rumped hawk's call is "a high-pitched whistle" with some variations such as "KEEEEiu" and "a longer, more monotonous high-pitched whistle".

Status

The IUCN has assessed the white-rumped hawk as being of Least Concern. It has a large range, but its population size is not known and is believed to be decreasing. No immediate threats have been identified. It is "generally rather local and nowhere common, but tolerates somewhat disturbed forest".

References

white-rumped hawk
Birds of the Northern Andes
Birds of the Atlantic Forest
white-rumped hawk
Taxonomy articles created by Polbot